WLOM (90.5 FM) was a radio station licensed to the community of Somers Point, New Jersey.

The station went on the air with a Contemporary Christian Music format on October 22, 2000. As WXGN, original licensee Joy Broadcasting, Inc. was granted the original construction permit on February 9, 1996.

Effective August 17, 2020, Joy Broadcasting sold WXGN to Hope Christian Church of Marlton, who began broadcasting their "Hope FM" Christian radio format. The station changed its call sign to WLOM on August 24, 2020.

On July 26, 2021, Hope Christian Church surrendered the WLOM license for cancellation. Simultaneously, it filed to upgrade another Hope FM transmitter, WWFP in Brigantine.

References

External links

LOM (FM)
Radio stations established in 2000
Radio stations disestablished in 2021
2000 establishments in New Jersey
2021 disestablishments in New Jersey
Defunct radio stations in the United States
Defunct religious radio stations in the United States
LOM